The M10 (sometimes referred to as the R368) is a metropolitan route in the Nelson Mandela Bay Municipality in South Africa that connects Port Elizabeth and Uitenhage.

It is an alternative route to the R75 Route for travel between Port Elizabeth and Uitenhage.

Route 
The M10 begins at a junction with the R102 (Govan Mbeki Avenue) and the M5 (Mount Road) in North End (north of the Port Elizabeth City Centre), heading north-west. It runs along Harrower Road, then Stanford Road (meeting the M8 Kempston Road), to cross the N2 Highway and pass through the southern part of Bethelsdorp.

At the Booysens Park suburb, the M10 turns northwards onto Nooitgedacht Road and reaches a t-junction with Old Uitenhage Road, where it meets the western terminus of the M14. The M10 becomes the Old Uitenhage Road north-westwards and meets the western terminus of the M19 west of Despatch, adjacent to the Nelson Mandela Bay Logistics Park. Here, it becomes Algoa Road and enters Uitenhage's Industrial Area. It then bends to the west, meeting the M22 and becoming Durban Street, to end at a junction with the R334 (Cuyler Street) in the Uitenhage town centre.

References

Metropolitan Routes in Port Elizabeth
Nelson Mandela Bay Metropolitan Municipality